Mumsie is a 1927 British silent drama film directed by Herbert Wilcox and starring Pauline Frederick, Nelson Keys and Herbert Marshall. It was adapted from the 1920 play of the same title by Edward Knoblock about a favourite son of a family who proves to be a coward when war breaks out. Pauline Frederick's last silent film. Mumsie is a lost film. It was made at Twickenham Studios.

The film was a major success and helped Herbert Marshall establish himself in Hollywood soon afterwards.

Cast
 Pauline Frederick as Mumsie
 Nelson Keys as Spud Murphy
 Herbert Marshall as Col. Armytage (film debut)
 Frank Stanmore as Nobby Clarke
 Donald Macardle as Noel Symonds
 Irene Russell as Louise Symonds
 Rolf Leslie as Edgar Symonds

References

Bibliography
 Low, Rachel. The History of British Film: Volume IV, 1918–1929. Routledge, 1997.

External links

theatre advert for showing on The Isle of Man(archived)

1927 films
1927 drama films
1920s English-language films
Films directed by Herbert Wilcox
Films shot at Twickenham Film Studios
Lost British films
British drama films
British silent feature films
British black-and-white films
1920s British films
Silent drama films